Glynnis O'Connor (born November 19, 1956) is an American actress of television, film, radio, and theater. She first gained wide attention in the mid-1970s with leading roles in the television version of Our Town and in the short-lived series Sons and Daughters.  She also co-starred with Robby Benson in the films Jeremy in 1973 and Ode to Billy Joe in 1976, as well as with Jan-Michael Vincent in the film Baby Blue Marine in 1976.

Personal life
O'Connor was born in New Rochelle, New York, and is the daughter of actress Lenka Peterson and film producer Daniel Patrick O'Connor. She is married to Douglas Stern, a New York City native, and they have two daughters together, Lindsay (b. 1990) and Hana.

Career
In 1973, O'Connor sang the title song for the film Jeremy in which she also co-starred with Robby Benson.  On January 8, 1974, she starred in the CBS Radio Mystery Theatre production of "Ring of Roses" and then co-starred with  John Travolta in the 1976 made-for-television movie The Boy in the Plastic Bubble. The same year she portrayed Bobbie Lee Hartley, co-starring again with Robby Benson, in the film Ode to Billy Joe, a tragic romance produced and directed by Max Baer Jr.

In 1984, O'Connor starred as Leola Mae Harmon in the biographical made-for-TV movie Why Me?, about United States Air Force nurse Harmon's trauma and series of facial reconstruction surgeries after a horrifying car accident. She was also cast in 1984 in the comedy Johnny Dangerously.  In 1986, O'Connor performed in the NBC made-for-TV movie The Deliberate Stranger.

O’Connor played defense attorney Anne Paulsen in five episodes, from 1998 through 2004, on  the television series Law & Order. In 2007 she appeared in the independent feature film P.J., directed by Russ Emanuel.

Filmography

Film

Television

References

External links
 
 

1956 births
American film actresses
American soap opera actresses
American television actresses
Best Performance by a Foreign Actress Genie Award winners
Living people
Actresses from New Rochelle, New York
21st-century American women
New Rochelle High School alumni